Edison (also known as Edison Force in the United States) is a 2005 American thriller film written and directed by David J. Burke, and starring Morgan Freeman, LL Cool J, Justin Timberlake in his feature film debut, and Kevin Spacey.

Synopsis

There is a force of corrupt cops called F.R.A.T, and the policemen who work for F.R.A.T are above the law. That is, until Joshua Pollack, an Edison journalist discovers a glitch in the system. Now, with the help of those who he trusts, he might be able to take F.R.A.T down.

Cast
 Morgan Freeman as Moses Ashford
 LL Cool J as Officer Raphael Deed
 Justin Timberlake as Joshua Pollack
 Kevin Spacey as Detective Levon Wallace
 Dylan McDermott as Sergeant Francis Lazerov
 John Heard as Captain Brian Tilman
 Cary Elwes as District Attorney Jack Reigert
 Damien Dante Wayans as Isiaha Charles
 Roselyn Sánchez as Maria
 Marco Sanchez as Reyes
 Piper Perabo as Willow Summerfield
 Françoise Yip as Crow

Production
While the film was in production, some people speculated from the title of the film and the limited story details of corrupt officers that the film was based upon the New Jersey township of Edison, since the township's recent (as of that time) controversy involving its police force. Writer and film director David J. Burke claimed that the name "Edison" was derived from its common association with the inventor and business leader Thomas Edison, which led to thoughts of "electricity, power and industry."

Release
The film was originally supposed to see a US release in the spring of 2005; however, due to its poor reviews from critics after its screening at the Toronto International Film Festival, its release to cinemas in the US and most other countries was cancelled. Sony Pictures Home Entertainment released the film, originally titled Edison, as Edison Force, direct–to–video on July 18, 2006. The film was released in theaters in Netherlands on March 12, 2006.

Reception
On Rotten Tomatoes Edison has an approval rating of 13% based on reviews from 8 critics.

In September 2017, when a Twitter user asked his followers to "name one bad Kevin Spacey movie", Spacey himself responded and simply wrote Edison.

References

External links
 
 

2005 films
2005 direct-to-video films
2005 crime thriller films
American direct-to-video films
American crime thriller films
2000s English-language films
Films shot in Vancouver
Metro-Goldwyn-Mayer films
Nu Image films
Films directed by David J. Burke
MoviePass Films films
Brightlight Pictures films
Films produced by Boaz Davidson
Films about police corruption
2000s American films